Carved in Stone is the 19th studio album by the German heavy metal band Rage. The album includes a bonus DVD with their full show at Wacken Open Air in August 2007 (featuring a symphonic orchestra from Minsk, Belarus, which under the name Lingua Mortis Orchestra toured with Rage in Europe) plus the videos for the songs "Lord of the Flies" and "Open My Grave".

Track listing

Personnel

Band members
Peter "Peavy" Wagner - vocals, bass
Victor Smolski - guitars, keyboards, sitar, orchestral arrangements, mixing, mastering
André Hilgers - drums

Additional musicians
Thomas Hackmann, Jen Majura - backing vocals

Production
Ingo 'Charly' Czajkowski - producer, engineer
Charlie Bauerfeind - mixing, mastering
Thomas Geiger - additional digital editing

References 

2008 albums
Rage (German band) albums
Nuclear Blast albums